The 2019 Supercars Championship (known for commercial reasons as the 2019 Virgin Australia Supercars Championship) was the twenty-first running of the Supercars Championship and the twenty-third series in which Supercars have contested the Australian Touring Car Championship, the premier title in Australian motorsport. The 2019 championship also included the running of the 1,000th Australian Touring Car Championship race, which was contested at the Melbourne 400.

Scott McLaughlin contested the series as the defending driver's champion. McLaughlin successfully defended his championship title, and in doing so, he broke Craig Lowndes' 1996 record for the most wins in a championship year when he recorded his seventeenth win at Pukekohe Park. His team, DJR Team Penske, won their second teams' championship. Ford secured the manufacturers' title at the Ipswich SuperSprint.

Teams and drivers
Holden was represented by factory-backed team Triple Eight Race Engineering respectively.

The following teams and drivers competed in the 2019 championship.

Manufacturer changes

The sixth generation Ford Mustang, the Mustang GT, was homologated for the 2019 championship. The Mustang was a replacement for the FG X Falcon, which was used between 2015 and 2018. Tickford Racing and DJR Team Penske oversaw the development of the car, with Ford Performance providing additional technical support. Ford Australia provided financial support in developing the car, but no team was officially recognised as a factory team. The homologation process required modifications to the bodywork to fit the series' control chassis, but the car continued to use the V8 engine used by the FG X Falcon. The decision to return the Mustang to the series was made as Australia's domestic production of the Ford Falcon ceased in 2016. The Mustang's return marked the first time since 1990 that a Mustang has contested the premier class of Australian motorsport. The car completed the homologation process in December 2018 and was subsequently approved for competition by the Supercars Commission.

Nissan withdrew its factory support from the championship at the end of 2018 as the company elected to change its global motorsport strategy and focus on its Formula E entry. Kelly Racing—who raced under the Nissan Motorsport name between 2013 and 2018—continued to compete with the Altima L33 chassis under licence from the company. Nissan's decision to withdraw from the championship followed the Altima being withdrawn from sale in Australia in 2017.

Team changes
The number of entries was reduced from twenty-six to twenty-four with both Tickford Racing and Triple Eight Race Engineering returning a Racing Entitlement Contract (REC) to the sport's management. 23Red Racing formed a partnership with Tickford Racing which saw it become a satellite team of Tickford. Matt Stone Racing upgraded from a VF Commodore to a ZB Commodore and are receiving technical support from Triple Eight Race Engineering.

Driver changes 
Michael Caruso left Kelly Racing, joining Tickford Racing as an endurance co-driver. Caruso's seat was filled by Garry Jacobson, who made his full time début in the championship with the team.

Craig Lowndes and Tim Blanchard retired from full-time competition at the end of the 2018 championship. Both returned as endurance co-drivers with Triple Eight Race Engineering and Brad Jones Racing respectively. Blanchard's seat at Tim Blanchard Racing was filled by Macauley Jones. Jones made his full time début in the championship, after having previously entered as a wildcard at selected events in 2017 and 2018.

Mark Winterbottom and Richie Stanaway left Tickford Racing. Winterbottom moved to Team 18, replacing Lee Holdsworth. Holdsworth took Winterbottom's place at Tickford Racing, while Stanaway moved to Garry Rogers Motorsport to replace Garth Tander. Tander stepped down from full-time competition, joining Triple Eight Race Engineering as an endurance co-driver.

Mid-season changes
Richie Stanaway was withdrawn halfway through the Winton SuperSprint and missed the next three rounds, due to a neck injury. He was replaced for the remainder of the round, and the following Darwin Triple Crown by Chris Pither, who had already been nominated as Stanaway's partner for the endurance races. Michael Caruso stepped in for the Townsville 400 and Ipswich SuperSprint, returning to the team for the first time since 2012. Stanaway was stood down halfway through the Gold Coast 600, due to disciplinary reasons. Chris Pither became the main driver for the Sunday race while Super2 and TCR Australia driver Dylan O'Keeffe made his debut with the team.

Calendar

The calendar was reduced to fifteen rounds in 2019, with the following events scheduled to take place:

Calendar changes
The 2019 calendar underwent a radical revision compared to the 2018 calendar. The Sydney SuperNight 300 was removed from the calendar entirely and was replaced by a new night race at Barbagallo Raceway. The change was made with the long-term view to running the Sydney round in January 2020 as part of a proposed move to a "summer series" format that would see the championship run primarily in the summer months.

The Sandown 500 moved to a late-season slot in November, becoming the final round of the Pirtek Enduro Cup, to avoid clashing with the AFL and NRL finals series. The Auckland SuperSprint was brought forward to September, making the Sandown 500 the penultimate round of the championship. Changes to the Formula One calendar meant that the Australian Grand Prix was run earlier in the year than it was in 2018, and thus the Supercars support races was also moved forward. The Adelaide 500 was subsequently brought forward to remain the opening round of the season.

Format changes
The Phillip Island Grand Prix Circuit event format reverted to a SuperSprint format after two years of two 250 kilometre races known as the Phillip Island 500.

Rule changes

Technical regulations 
As a cost reduction measure, the use of twin-spring dampers were banned with teams required to use linear spring dampers. A new specification of transaxle developed by Xtrac was introduced.

Sporting regulations 
If a car was released from the pit bay before the fuel rig was decoupled from the car, the car had to be re-raised on its pneumatic jacks and the fuel rig removed before the driver can rejoin the race.

Results and standings

Season summary

Points system
Points were awarded for each race at an event, to the driver or drivers of a car that completed at least 75% of the race distance and was running at the completion of the race. At least 50% of the planned race distance must be completed for the result to be valid and championship points awarded.

Standard: Used for all SuperSprint, SuperNight and street races, including the Gold Coast 600.
Bathurst: Used for the Bathurst 1000.
Sandown: Used for the Sandown 500.
Melbourne (long): Used for Race 1 and 3 of the Melbourne 400.
Melbourne (short): Used for Race 2 and 4 of the Melbourne 400, and the qualifying races for the Sandown 500.

Drivers' championship

Teams' championship

Champion Manufacturer of the Year
The Manufacturers award was won by Ford.

Pirtek Enduro Cup
The Pirtek Enduro Cup was won by Jamie Whincup and Craig Lowndes.

Notes

References

Supercars Championship seasons